Lirularia optabilis is a species of sea snail, a marine gastropod mollusk in the family Trochidae, the top snails.

This extinct marine species is only known from Pleistocene assemblages of Southern California.

References

External links
 To Biodiversity Heritage Library (1 publication)
 To Encyclopedia of Life
 To ITIS
 To World Register of Marine Species

optabilis